Kieran Thomas Green (born 30 June 1997) is an English professional footballer who plays as a central midfielder for EFL League Two club Grimsby Town.

He began his career as a professional for Hartlepool United, but would go on to appear at Non-league level for Spennymoor Town, Frickley Athletic, Gateshead, Blyth Spartans and York City. He joined FC Halifax Town in 2020, where he was part of the team who reached the National League play-offs.

Club career

Early career
Green was born in Stockton-on-Tees, County Durham. He joined Hartlepool United's youth academy at under-14 level from Stockton Town. Green made his first-team debut on 7 October 2014 at the age of 17, starting in a 2–1 Football League Trophy home loss against Sheffield United. He joined Northern Premier League Division One North club Spennymoor Town on 21 November on work experience.

Green signed a professional contract with Hartlepool in April 2015. He joined Northern Premier League Premier Division club Frickley Athletic on 15 October on a one-month loan.

Non-League
Green joined National League club Gateshead on 22 March 2017 loan until the end of the 2016–17 season. He for Gateshead permanently on 17 May on a one-year contract, having been released by Hartlepool at the end of the season.

Green joined National League North club Blyth Spartans on 14 November 2017 on a one-month loan. His loan was extended for a second month on 20 December. He was recalled by Gateshead on 5 January 2018 having impressed while on loan at Blyth. He returned to Blyth on 8 February on loan until 25 March. He signed for Blyth permanently on 15 June 2018.

Green signed for Blyth's National League North rivals York City on 14 May 2019.

On 18 August 2020, Green signed for National League side FC Halifax Town.

Grimsby Town
On 15 July 2022, Green signed for Grimsby Town for an undisclosed fee, penning a two-year deal with an option for a third year.

Career statistics

References

External links
Profile at the York City F.C. website

1997 births
Living people
Footballers from Stockton-on-Tees
Footballers from County Durham
English footballers
Association football midfielders
Stockton Town F.C. players
Hartlepool United F.C. players
Spennymoor Town F.C. players
Frickley Athletic F.C. players
Gateshead F.C. players
Blyth Spartans A.F.C. players
York City F.C. players
FC Halifax Town players
Grimsby Town F.C. players
English Football League players
Northern Premier League players
National League (English football) players